High schools in North America are schools for secondary education, which may also involve intermediate education. 

Highschooling in North America may refer to:

 Education in Canada for secondary/high school
 Education in Greenland for secondary/preparatory school
 Education in Mexico for secundaria and preparatoria
 High school in the United States
 Secondary education in the United States

See also
 
 
 
 High School (disambiguation)

 
Highschool
 
North America